Berthold (died 1111) was a Benedictine lay brother. Born in Parma, Italy, to Anglo-saxon parents, who escaped to Italy, from the Norman conquest of England. Berthold spent the majority of his life serving nuns in Parma, at the St. Alexander Convent.

References

Italian Roman Catholic saints
12th-century Christian saints
1111 deaths
Anglo-Saxon Benedictines
Religious leaders from Parma
Year of birth unknown